Mystic Falls is a  cascade type waterfall on the Little Firehole River, a tributary of the Firehole River.  Originally named Little Firehole Falls by members of the 1872 Hayden Geologic Survey, the name was changed to Mystic Falls by members of the Arnold Hague Geological Survey in 1885 for unknown reasons.
Mystic Falls is reached via the  Mystic Falls Trail which starts at Biscuit Basin in the Upper Geyser Basin.

Gallery

See also
 Trails of Yellowstone National Park
 Waterfalls in Yellowstone National Park

References

External links

Waterfalls of Yellowstone National Park
Waterfalls of Teton County, Wyoming